Steam Punks! is an Australian children's game show which premiered on ABC3 on 17 February 2013. The show sees Paul Verhoeven playing The Inquisitor, who helps teams complete multiple challenges who have become trapped in a bizarre world controlled by an evil genius named The Machine.

References

Australian Broadcasting Corporation original programming
Australian children's television series
2010s Australian game shows
Australian science fiction television series
2013 Australian television series debuts
2014 Australian television series endings